Torstein Håland (29 May 1925 – 23 November 2004) was a Norwegian politician for the Centre Party.

He served as a deputy representative to the Parliament of Norway from Vestfold during the term 1973–1977. He was the third candidate on the Liberal/Centre ballot behind Aslaug Fadum and Eystein Bærug. He was also mayor of Ramnes.

References

1925 births
2004 deaths
Deputy members of the Storting
Mayors of places in Vestfold
Centre Party (Norway) politicians
People from Re, Norway